Raymond Curtis Bice Sr. (April 5, 1896 – December 14, 1994) was a Wisconsin politician, historian, and businessman.

Born in La Crosse, Wisconsin, Bice was a building contractor and lumber dealer. He was a veteran of World War I. Bice served in the Wisconsin State Assembly in 1947-1951 and the Wisconsin State Senate in 1953–1969.

Bice also wrote books about the history of the La Crosse area: 'Years to Remember' and 'A Century to Remember.'

Notes

1896 births
1994 deaths
Politicians from La Crosse, Wisconsin
Military personnel from Wisconsin
Members of the Wisconsin State Assembly
Wisconsin state senators
Writers from La Crosse, Wisconsin
Local historians
20th-century American politicians